The Royal Company's Islands are a group of phantom islands reported by some early explorers to lie southwest of Tasmania. They were first heard of before 1840, but the original report cannot be traced.

The islands' existence was disproved as early as 1840 by the United States Exploring Expedition.  From 1889 to 1902 several vessels passed through the islands' vicinity without noting any landforms, and in 1904 the UK Hydrographic Office finally decided to remove them from all Admiralty charts.

In October 1894 the 'Antarctic' (H. Bull's exploratory whaling expedition sponsored by Svend Foyn) steered for the Royal Company's Islands "supposed to be situated in about lat. 51 degrees S,. and long. 142 E." They searched for a couple of days, but met with gales. Not finding any islands, they headed for Macquarie Island. Further searches by the Nimrod in 1909 and the Aurora in 1912 turned up nothing.

See also
 Emerald Island (phantom)
 Nimrod Islands
 Dougherty Island

References and sources
References

Sources

External links
Chart showing track of the S. Y. Aurora around charted positions of Royal Company's Islands on the 1912 Australasian Antarctic Expedition

Phantom subantarctic islands